Nadbai Legislative Assembly constituency is one of the 200 Legislative Assembly constituencies of Rajasthan state in India.

It is part of Bharatpur district.

Member of the Legislative Assembly

Election Results

2018

2013

2008

2003

1998

1993

1990

1985

1980

1977

1972

1967

See also
 List of constituencies of the Rajasthan Legislative Assembly
 Bharatpur district

References

Bharatpur district
Assembly constituencies of Rajasthan